Red American  is a 1991 Italian comedy-drama film. It was the directorial debut of Alessandro D'Alatri, who was awarded the David di Donatello Award for Best New Director for his work on the film.

The film also won the Globo d'oro,  the Grolla d'oro and the Ciak d'oro for the cinematography by Alessio Gelsini Torresi.

Cast 
Burt Young as George Maniago 
Fabrizio Bentivoglio as  Vittorio Benvegnù 
Valeria Milillo as  Antonietta 
Massimo Ghini as  Questore Santesso
Sabrina Ferilli as  Zaira
 Tullia Alborghetti as Elvira
 Beatrice Palme as  Adey 
Pino Ammendola as  cavalier Gervasutti 
Eros Pagni as  Oscar Benvegnù
Miranda Martino as  Nella Dalpoz

See also        
 List of Italian films of 1991

References

External links

1991 films
Italian comedy-drama films
1991 comedy-drama films
Films directed by Alessandro D'Alatri
1991 directorial debut films
1990s Italian films